Wesley Louis Grant (born September 24, 1946) is an American former football defensive end who played in the National Football League for the { NY Giants} Buffalo Bills, San Diego Chargers, Cleveland Browns, and Houston Oilers from 1971 to 1973.

References

1946 births
Living people
Buffalo Bills players
San Diego Chargers players
Cleveland Browns players
Houston Oilers players